Chandler Champion is an American beauty pageant titleholder from Leeds, Alabama who was named Miss Alabama 2013.

Biography
She won the title of Miss Alabama on June 8, 2013, when she received her crown from outgoing titleholder Anna Laura Bryan. Champion's platform was “Chandler's Challenge,” her organization that promotes literacy across the state of Alabama. Her competition talent was a ballet en pointe dance.

Champion is an undergraduate at University of Alabama, majoring in dance and broadcast journalism. As part of Miss America's “Show Us Your Shoes” parade along the Atlantic City Boardwalk, Champion wore a houndstooth patterned dress with “Roll Tide” written on the front and a 2012 national champions insignia on the back in celebration of the national champion 2012 Alabama Crimson Tide football team.

References

External links

 

Living people
American beauty pageant winners
Miss Alabama winners
Miss America 2014 delegates
People from Leeds, Alabama
University of Alabama alumni
Year of birth missing (living people)